Thion (also Dolphin Island) is a small uninhabited island in Sanma Province of Vanuatu in the Pacific Ocean.

Geography
Thion lies a few kilometers in Shark Bay off the eastern coast of Espiritu Santo. The estimated terrain elevation above the sea level is some 213 meters. The islet has two fresh-water lakes. There is an old abandoned cattle ranch there. Nowadays, the island is uninhabited and only used for picnicking by the locals. Thion Island is also known as Dolphin Island because of its profile.

References

Islands of Vanuatu
Sanma Province
Uninhabited islands of Vanuatu